FHV may refer to:

 Fair Haven (Amtrak station), in Vermont, United States
 Feline herpesvirus
 Vorarlberg University of Applied Sciences,, in Austria